Pam Bristol Brady (née Stockton; born 1953) is an American retired badminton player who excelled at both the national and international levels.  Noted for her anticipation and crisp shot-making ability, she won twenty U.S. national titles between 1972 and 1985; four in singles, eleven in women's doubles, and five in mixed doubles. In the three national championships that were open to foreign competition during her badminton prime (1972, 1973, 1976) she reached the final in six of nine events, winning the women's doubles with Diane Hales in 1973. She won South Africa's open singles and women's doubles titles during a U.S. team tour of that country in 1971. She shared both the women's doubles and mixed doubles titles at the first Pan American Championships in 1977. She represented the USA in team matches including the Uber Cup (women's world team) campaigns of '71-'72, '77-'78, and '80-'81. Mrs. Brady was elected to the U.S. Badminton Hall of Fame in 1981. She is married to Danny Brady, a fine player in his own right, with whom she won national mixed doubles titles in 1981 and 1982.

References

American female badminton players
1953 births
Living people
21st-century American women